Katrina May Shanks (born 12 May 1969) is a former New Zealand politician who was a list member of parliament for the National Party from 2007 to 2014.

Early years
Shanks was born in Dannevirke in 1969, and attended St Matthew's Collegiate for Girls in Masterton and Dannevirke High School. She graduated with a Bachelor of Business Studies from Massey University.

Shanks' father, Graeme Hislop, contested the Pahiatua electorate for Social Credit in 1975 and in the 1977 by-election.

Prior to entering politics, Shanks worked as a self-employed accountant. She had previously worked as a project accountant for the Westpac Banking Corporation, in retail client services for Newton Investment Management in the United Kingdom, and as a senior auditor for Audit New Zealand. Shanks has three children.

Shanks joined the New Zealand National Party in 2001 as a member of the Karori branch and was a member of the party's executive committee for the  electorate until 2004, when she joined the Ohariu-Belmont branch.

Member of Parliament

Shanks was the National Party's candidate in Ohariu-Belmont at the 2005 general election. She did not defeat incumbent Peter Dunne but performed more strongly than National's 2002 candidate Dale Stevens. At 46th on the party list, Shanks was the highest-placed National list candidate not to be elected (indeed, the election night result projected that she would be elected but the final result saw National's result drop by one seat). She eventually joined Parliament in February 2007 when former leader Don Brash resigned.

Shanks became her party's Associate Spokeswoman for Commerce and Associate Spokeswoman for Economic Development, as well as a member of the Social Services Select Committee, which she held for the remainder of the term.

In the 2008 general election, Shanks contested the new Ōhariu electorate but did not intend to win. National ran a "party vote only" campaign in that seat to ensure ally Dunne's re-election. She was placed again at 46th on the party list and National's stronger party vote result meant that she returned to Parliament. National, with Dunne's support, formed a new minority Government. Shanks was a member of the Commerce Committee as well as deputy chair (2008–2009) and later chair (2009–2011) of the Social Services Committee.

Shanks was elected as a list MP for a final time in 2011. She announced her intention to retire from Parliament at the 2014 general election but instead retired early at the end of 2013. She was succeeded as a list MP by Jo Hayes.

Post-parliamentary career 
After leaving Parliament, Shanks became chief executive of the New Zealand Funeral Directors Association. She held this role until 2018 when she became the inaugural chief executive of Financial Advice New Zealand.

Notes

References

External links
 Katrina Shanks - New Zealand National Party Website
 Katrina Shanks MP - Official website
 New Zealand Parliament Profile on Katrina Shanks

1969 births
Living people
New Zealand National Party MPs
Women members of the New Zealand House of Representatives
New Zealand list MPs
New Zealand accountants
Unsuccessful candidates in the 2005 New Zealand general election
Members of the New Zealand House of Representatives
Massey University alumni
People from Dannevirke
21st-century New Zealand politicians
21st-century New Zealand women politicians
People educated at St Matthew's Collegiate School